Wrottesley may refer to:

Baron Wrottesley, a title in the Peerage of the United Kingdom (and any member of the Wrottesley family holding that title)
John Wrottesley (disambiguation)
Wrottesley (crater), an impact crater on the Moon
Wrottesley Hall, Staffordshire
Wrottesley Polytechnic, fictional establishment created by Howard Jacobson in his Coming from Behind